Almalo is a rural locality (a selo) in Kumtorkalinsky District, Republic of Dagestan, Russia. The population was 1,619 as of 2010. There are 10 streets.

Geography 
Almalo is located 12 km northwest of Korkmaskala (the district's administrative centre) by road. Tyube and Temirgoye are the nearest rural localities.

Nationalities 
Avars and Kumyks live there.

References 

Rural localities in Kumtorkalinsky District